Dilli Prasad Upreti is a Nepalese politician. He is a member of Provincial Assembly of Madhesh Province from CPN (Unified Socialist). Upreti, a resident of Hariwan, was elected via 2017 Nepalese provincial elections from Sarlahi 3(A).

Electoral history

2017 Nepalese provincial elections

References

Living people
1959 births
Madhesi people
21st-century Nepalese politicians
Members of the Provincial Assembly of Madhesh Province
Communist Party of Nepal (Unified Socialist) politicians